Fowler (formerly, Fowler's Switch) is a city in Fresno County, California, United States. It is located within the San Joaquin Valley. It has a strong agricultural community, with lush grape vineyards and expansive farmland. The population was 5,570 at the 2010 census.

History
Fowler's first post office opened in 1882. Fowler was incorporated June 15, 1908. The community was named for rancher Thomas Fowler, an early 1870s California state senator.

Geography

Demographics

The 2010 United States Census reported that Fowler had a population of 5,570. The racial makeup of Fowler was 2,634 (47.3%) White, 104 (1.9%) African American, 136 (2.4%) Native American, 610 (11.0%) Asian, 8 (0.1%) Pacific Islander, 1,800 (32.3%) from other races, and 278 (5.0%) from two or more races. Hispanic or Latino of any race were 3,687 persons (66.2%).

The Census reported that 5,523 people (99.2% of the population) lived in households, 0 (0%) lived in non-institutionalized group quarters, and 47 (0.8%) were institutionalized.

There were 1,723 households, out of which 838 (48.6%) had children under the age of 18 living in them, 932 (54.1%) were opposite-sex married couples living together, 276 (16.0%) had a female householder with no husband present, 120 (7.0%) had a male householder with no wife present. There were 114 (6.6%) unmarried opposite-sex partnerships, and 14 (0.8%) same-sex married couples or partnerships. 333 households (19.3%) were made up of individuals, and 118 (6.8%) had someone living alone who was 65 years of age or older. The average household size was 3.21. There were 1,328 families (77.1% of all households); the average family size was 3.68.

The population was spread out, with 1,662 people (29.8%) under the age of 18, 591 people (10.6%) aged 18 to 24, 1,558 people (28.0%) aged 25 to 44, 1,203 people (21.6%) aged 45 to 64, and 556 people (10.0%) who were 65 years of age or older. The median age was 31.6 years. For every 100 females, there were 99.5 males.  For every 100 females age 18 and over, there were 94.6 males.

The homeowner vacancy rate was 2.6%; the rental vacancy rate was 5.2%. 3,651 people (65.5% of the population) lived in owner-occupied housing units and 1,872 people (33.6%) lived in rental housing units.

In 1920, Armenians comprised 65% of the population of Fowler, with 1,000 Armenian residents out of a total population of 1,528.

Notable natives and residents
 Marvin R. Baxter, Associate Justice of the Supreme Court of California
 Ernest A. Bedrosian, founder of the Raisin Bargaining Association (RBA), 1967. His dynamic organizational skill brought together over 1,000 raisin growers to form the largest agricultural bargaining association in America. The RBA's bargaining power was instrumental in increasing raisin grower returns from $180/ton to a recent record of $1,900/ton with a corresponding record increase for raisin grower land values.
 Jerry Dyer, Mayor of Fresno
 Richard Hagopian, American Oriental-style oud player and traditional Armenian musician.
 Victor Davis Hanson, classicist, historian, and political writer.
 Douglas Jamgochian, professional dancer who has worked on both stage and screen.
 Herman A. Lawson, highly decorated U.S. Army Air Force/U.S. Air Force officer, combat fighter pilot, and combat flight instructor with the 332nd Fighter Group's 99th Pursuit Squadron, best known as the Tuskegee Airmen or "Red Tails". He was one of 1,007 documented Tuskegee Airmen Pilots.

References

External links
 
 Fowler history
 Fowler Wiki

Incorporated cities and towns in California
Cities in Fresno County, California
Populated places established in 1908
1908 establishments in California